The 1985 FIBA Europe Under-16 Championship (known at that time as 1985 European Championship for Cadets) was the 8th edition of the FIBA Europe Under-16 Championship. The city of Ruse, in Bulgaria, hosted the tournament. Yugoslavia won the trophy for the fourth time and became the most winning country in the tournament. It was its second title in a row and third in the last four tournaments.

Teams

Preliminary round
The twelve teams were allocated in two groups of six teams each.

Group A

Group B

Knockout stage

9th–12th playoffs

5th–8th playoffs

Championship

Final standings

Team roster
Emilio Kovačić, Nenad Trunić, Zoran Kalpić, Toni Kukoč, Slaviša Koprivica, Nebojša Ilić, Nebojša Razić, Rade Milutinović, Vlade Divac, Dževad Alihodžić, Nenad Videka, and Radenko Dobraš.
Head coach: Svetislav Pešić.

References
FIBA Archive
FIBA Europe Archive

FIBA U16 European Championship
1985–86 in European basketball
1985 in Bulgarian sport
International youth basketball competitions hosted by Bulgaria